Rhopaluridae is a family of worms belonging to the phylum Orthonectida, order and class unknown.

Genera:
 Ciliocincta Kozloff, 1965
 Intoshia Giard, 1877
 Prothelminthus Jourdain, 1880
 Rhopalura Giard, 1877
 Stoecharthrum Caullery & Mesnil, 1899

References

Orthonectida